Québec-Comté (or Quebec County) was a former provincial electoral district in the Capitale-Nationale region of Quebec, Canada.  It was located in the general area of Quebec County, one of the historic counties of Quebec. It elected members to the Legislative Assembly of Quebec.

It was created for the 1867 election.  Its final election was in 1962.  It disappeared in the 1966 election and its successor electoral district was Chauveau.

Members of the Legislative Assembly
 Pierre-Joseph-Olivier Chauveau, Conservative Party (1867–1873)
 Pierre Garneau, Conservative Party (1873–1878)
 David Alexander Ross, Liberal (1878–1881)
 Pierre Garneau, Conservative Party (1881–1886)
 Thomas Chase Casgrain, Conservative Party (1886–1890)
 Charles Fitzpatrick, Liberal (1890–1896)
 Némèse Garneau, Liberal (1897–1901)
 Cyril Fraser Delâge, Liberal (1901–1916)
 Aurèle Leclerc, Liberal (1916–1923)
 Ludger Bastien, Conservative Party (1924–1927)
 Joseph-Ephraim Bedard, Liberal (1927–1935)
 Francis Byrne, Liberal (1935–1936)
 Adolphe Marcoux, Union Nationale (1936–1939)
 François-Xavier Bouchard, Liberal (1939–1944)
 René Chaloult, Nationaliste - Independent (1944–1952)
 Jean-Jacques Bédard, Liberal (1952–1956)
 Émilien Rochette, Union Nationale (1956–1960)
 Jean-Jacques Bédard, Liberal (1960–1966)

Election results

References
Election results
 Election results (National Assembly)

Former provincial electoral districts of Quebec